The Caffè Fiorio is a historic café in Turin, northern Italy, located at Via Po 8.

Founded in 1780, Fiorio became a fashionable meeting place for the artistic, intellectual and political classes of the capital of the Kingdom of Sardinia. Frequented by Urbano Rattazzi, Massimo D'Azeglio, Giovanni Prati, Camillo Benso Conte di Cavour (who founded the Whist Club here), Giacinto Provana di Collegno, Cesare Balbo  and Friedrich Nietzsche, it became known as "the café of the Machiavellis and of the pigtails."

See also

References

Sources
This article includes text translated from its counterpart in the Italian Wikipedia.

External links
‘Caffè storici di Torino’, Comune di Torino.

Buildings and structures in Turin
Fiorio
1780 establishments in Italy
1780 establishments in the Kingdom of Sardinia